Şakirin Mosque (pronounced Shakirin) is a mosque in Istanbul, Turkey. The building is located at one of the entrances of the historic Karacaahmet Cemetery in Üsküdar. It was built by the Semiha Şakir Foundation in memory of İbrahim Şakir and Semiha Şakir and opened on 7 May 2009. According to newspaper reports, it is the most carbon-neutral mosque in Turkey.

History
The mosque's architect was Hüsrev Tayla, known for his work on Kocatepe Mosque in Ankara and for his architectural conservation work. Its interior designer was Zeynep Fadıllıoğlu, a great-niece of Semiha Şakir,  and also according to newspaper reports, the first female interior designer of a mosque, as well as the first woman to design a mosque in modern Turkey.

Construction of the mosque took four years. It is 10,000 square meters in area. It has two minarets, each 35 meters high, and a dome of aluminum composite. The calligraphy on the interior of the dome was written by Semih İrteş. The large windows on three sides of the prayer hall were designed by Orhan Koçan. The minbar is acrylic and was designed by Tayfun Erdoğmuş. Decorative motifs are derived from Seljuk art. The large, asymmetrical chandelier has waterdrop-shaped glass globes made by Nahide Büyükkaymakçı, "reflecting a prayer that Allah's light should fall on worshipers like rain," and the women's section is designed especially to allow a clear view of the chandelier. The fountain in the courtyard was designed by William Pye. The mosque is built over a parking garage and also includes an exhibition area. 
The mosque's architect is believed to be the first woman to design a mosque in modern times.

See also
 Çamlıca Mosque, designed by two female architects

References

External links

 Sakirin Mosque, designed by Zeynep Fadillioglu - Article Blog LeMonde.fr
 Picture and details published in Time Magazine, USA

Mosques in Istanbul
Üsküdar
Mosques completed in 2009
21st-century mosques
21st-century religious buildings and structures in Turkey